Wormit railway station served the town of Wormit, Fife, Scotland from 1889 to 1969 on the Newport Railway.

History 
The station opened on 1 May 1889 by the Newport Railway. In 1955 a train crash occurred where 3 people were killed and 41 were injured, 15 with severe injuries. The station closed to both passengers and goods traffic on 5 May 1969.

References 

Disused railway stations in Fife
Former North British Railway stations
Railway stations in Great Britain opened in 1889
Railway stations in Great Britain closed in 1969
1889 establishments in Scotland
1969 disestablishments in Scotland
Newport-on-Tay